Leeman is a small unincorporated community located in the Town of Maine in northern Outagamie County, Wisconsin, United States. It is two miles west of Nichols and one  mile south of Shawano County. The Wolf River runs through the community. Postal service is provided by the Shiocton post office, ZIP code 54170.

Transportation
Leeman is located on Wisconsin Highway 187 and Wisconsin Highway 168.  Outagamie County Highway F also enters the community.

Images

References

Unincorporated communities in Outagamie County, Wisconsin
Unincorporated communities in Wisconsin